The Land of Onias is the name given in Hellenistic Egyptian, Jewish, and Roman sources to an area in Ancient Egypt's Nile delta where a large number of Jews settled. The Land of Onias, which included the city of Leontopolis (Λεόντων πόλις), was located in the nome of Heliopolis. While accounts differ on the details, it is known that the Jews of Leontopolis had a functioning temple, distinct from and contemporary to the one in Jerusalem, presided over by kohanim (priests) of the family of Onias IV, for whom the "Land of Onias" is named. Aside from a somewhat uncertain allusion of the Hellenist Artapanus, only Josephus gives information about this temple. The Talmudic accounts are internally contradictory. The establishment of a central sanctuary in Egypt was probably undertaken in response, in part, to the disorders that arose in Judea under Antiochus IV Epiphanes, the desecration of the Temple at Jerusalem under his reign, the supplanting of the legitimate family of priests by the installation of Alcimus, the personal ambition of Onias IV, and the vast extent of the Jewish diaspora in Egypt that created a demand for a sanctuary of this nature.

Jewish temple at Leontopolis (c. 170 BCE - 73 CE)
The account of Josephus in The Jewish War, refers to the Onias who built the Temple at Leontopolis as "the son of Simon", implying that it was Onias III, and not his son, who fled to Egypt and built the Temple. This account, however, is contradicted by the story that Onias III was murdered in Antioch in 171 BCE. Josephus' account in the Antiquities is, therefore, more probable, namely, that the builder of the temple was a son of the murdered Onias III, and that, a mere youth at the time of his father's death, he had fled to the court of Alexandria in consequence of the Syrian persecutions, perhaps because he thought that salvation would come to his people from Egypt. Ptolemy VI was King of Egypt at that time. He probably had not yet given up his claims to Coele-Syria and Judea, and gladly gave refuge to such a prominent personage of the neighboring country. Onias now requested the king and his sister-wife, Cleopatra, to allow him to build a sanctuary in Egypt similar to the one at Jerusalem, where he would employ Levites and priests of his own clan; and he referred to the prediction of the prophet Isaiah that a Jewish temple would be erected in Egypt.

According to Josephus, the temple of Leontopolis existed for 343 years, though the general opinion is that this number must be changed to 243. He relates that the Roman emperor Vespasian feared that through this temple Egypt might become a new center for Jewish rebellion and therefore ordered the governor of Egypt, Lupus, to demolish it. Lupus died in the process of carrying out the order; and the task of stripping the temple of its treasures, barring access to it, and removing all traces of divine worship at the site was completed by his successor, Paulinus, which dates the event to c. March-August 73. 

In his dig at Tell al-Yahudi in 1905/6, Flinders Petrie identified the remains of this temple.

Onias' letters
Josephus quotes two documents: Onias' letter to the royal couple, and the king's answer to Onias. Both of these, however, appear spurious, on the following grounds: Onias refers in his letter to his military exploits in Coele-Syria and Phoenicia, although it is not certain that the general Onias and the priest Onias are identical. His assertion that a central sanctuary is necessary because a multiplicity of temples causes dissension among the Jews evidences imperfect knowledge of the Jewish religious life; and, finally, his request for the ruined temple of the goddess Bubastis, because a sufficient supply of wood and sacrificial animals would be found there, seems unwise and improbable for a suppliant who must first obtain compliance with his principal request. It seems strange, furthermore, that in the second letter the pagan king points out to the Jewish priest that the proposed building of a temple is contrary to the law, and that he consents only in view of Isaiah's prophecy. Both letters were apparently written by a Hellenistic Jew.

Layout of the Temple
Only this can be stated as a fact, that the temple of Leontopolis was built on the site of a ruined temple of Bubastis, in imitation of the temple at Jerusalem, though smaller and less elaborate. The statement in Wars of the Jews vii. 10, § 2 of Onias' argument that by the building of this temple the whole Jewish nation would be brought to turn from the Syrians to the Ptolemies seems very plausible, and may have given rise to the assertion made in the letters that there were dissensions among the Jews. The "fortress" (ὀχύρωμα) of the temple of Bubastis may be explained by the statement, which seems credible, that Onias built a fortress (θρωύριον) around the temple in order to protect the surrounding territory, which now received the designation "Oneion".

The Onias temple was not exactly similar to the Temple at Jerusalem, being more in the form of a high tower; and as regards the interior arrangement, it had not a menorah-type candelabrum, but a hanging lamp. The building had a court (τέμενος), which was surrounded by a brick wall with stone gates. The king endowed the temple with large revenues—a fact that may have suggested to the writer of the letters mentioned above the wealth of wood and sacrificial animals.

Legitimacy of its sacrificial cult
The reputation which the temple of Onias enjoyed is indicated by the fact that the Septuagint, written in the Jewish community of Alexandria, changes the phrase "city of destruction" to "city of righteousness" (πόλις ἀσεδέκ). The Egyptian Jews sacrificed frequently in the temple of Leontopolis, although at the same time they fulfilled their duty toward the Temple at Jerusalem, as Philo narrates that he himself did. The Temple at Leontopolis never gained the popularity of that of Jerusalem; while the Alexandrine Jews might like having a subordinate temple close to home, support for the Temple of Onias never was seen to replace the need to send tithes and pilgrims to Jerusalem. Indeed, the Leontopolist temple site seems never to have achieved even the importance of the synagogue in Alexandria's Jewish quarter.

In the Talmud the origin of the temple of Onias is narrated with legendary additions, there being two versions of the account. Here also Onias is mentioned as the son of Simon, and that Isaiah's prophecy is referred to. In regard to the Law the temple of Onias (Beit Honio, or "House of Onias", handed down in the name of Saadia Gaon as Beit Honi) was looked upon as forbidden, though there is a question as to whether idolatry was done there or not. The possibility of the priests of Onias being admitted to officiate at Jerusalem was explicitly stated, while one passage even expresses the view that sacrificial worship was permissible in the temple of Onias; however, this view was rejected, and is based on the view that idolatry was not performed there. The opinion was prevalent among the Rabbis that the temple of Onias was situated at Alexandria—an error that is repeated by all the chroniclers of the Middle Ages. This temple is also sometimes confused or conflated with the Samaritan temple on Mount Gerizim.

Military service
Many of the Jewish settlers in the Land of Onias were military colonists who served in the army of the Ptolemeid kings. Ananias and Chelkias, the sons of Onias IV, both served as generals in the army of Cleopatra III (r.117-81 BCE).

See also
 History of the Jews in Egypt
 Jewish Temple at Elephantine

Notes

References

Gottheil, Richard and Samuel Krauss. "Leontopolis." Jewish Encyclopedia. Funk and Wagnalls, 1901-1906, which cites:
Heinriech Grätz, Gesch. 4th ed., iii. 27 et seq.;
Weiss, Dor, i. 130;
Willrich, Juden und Griechen, pp. 146-150;
Schürer, Gesch. 3d ed., iii. 97;
Büchler, Tobiaden und Oniaden, pp. 239-276, Vienna, 1899 (this author's opinion, that originally a Samaritan temple was referred to, is not tenable)
Kuenen, Abraham and Alfred Heath May. The Religion of Israel to the Fall of the Jewish State, Volume 3. London: Williams and Norgate, 1883.

Ancient Jewish Egyptian history
Jews and Judaism in the Roman Republic and the Roman Empire
Jewish Ptolemaic history
Nile Delta